NGM can refer to:
NASDAQ Global Market
National Guitar Museum, USA
Nested Grid Model, for weather prediction
New Generation Mobile, a phone manufacturer
Nordic Growth Market, a Swedish exchange for Nordic growth companies